The Harley E. Green House is a historic house on Arkansas Highway 926, just north of Bear, Arkansas.  It is a -story wood-frame structure, built in a cross-gable configuration with shed-roof sections in the corners of the cross.  Some of these corner sections are enclosed, adding to the mass of the interior, while others shelter porches.  The exterior and interior of the house both exhibit the detailed woodwork typical of the Stick/Eastlake style.  The house was built in 1888 by Harley Green, a local woodworker, during Bear's brief boom period as a gold and silver mining town.  Of more than fifty houses estimated to have been built by him, it is one of only four to survive.

The house was listed on the National Register of Historic Places in 1979.

See also
National Register of Historic Places listings in Garland County, Arkansas

References

Houses on the National Register of Historic Places in Arkansas
Queen Anne architecture in Arkansas
Houses completed in 1885
Buildings and structures in Garland County, Arkansas
National Register of Historic Places in Garland County, Arkansas
1885 establishments in Arkansas